Andrew Bolton (born May 23, 1954) is a former American football running back who played for the Seattle Seahawks and the Detroit Lions of the National Football League (NFL). He played college football at Fisk University.

References 

1954 births
Living people
American football running backs
Fisk University alumni
Players of American football from Tennessee
Seattle Seahawks players
Detroit Lions players